Valentina Yuryevna Ivakhnenko (born 27 June 1993) is a Russian former professional tennis player.

On 30 July 2018, she reached her highest singles ranking of world No. 167, whilst her best doubles ranking by the WTA was 104 on 28 November 2016.

In September 2014, after Crimea was annexed by Russia, Ukraine-born Ivakhnenko switched to Russia. She retired from a professional tour in 2022.

WTA career finals

Doubles: 1 (runner-up)

ITF Circuit finals

Singles: 14 (7 titles, 7 runner–ups)

Doubles: 50 (35 titles, 15 runner–ups)

References

External links
 
 

1993 births
Living people
Ukrainian female tennis players
Russian female tennis players
People from Yalta
Ukrainian emigrants to Russia
Naturalised citizens of Russia